The Suriname tapeti (Sylvilagus parentum) or Suriname lowland forest cottontail is a South American species of cottontail rabbit described in 2017. It is known from the lowlands of western Suriname, and was described from specimens collected by Dutch scientists in the 1980s. Its size is relatively large for a South American cottontail rabbit. The rabbit is likely already threatened due to environmental degradation in the region, and its discovery could boost conservation efforts in the area. It was discovered by  Portland State University Professor Luis Ruedas.

References

Sylvilagus
Mammals described in 2017
Endemic fauna of Suriname